This is a list of notable people from the Commonwealth of Dominica. The list include also individuals with Dominican ancestry and citizenship.

Politics

Presidents
Nicholas Liverpool 
Charles Savarin
Clarence Seignoret
Vernon Shaw
Crispin Sorhaindo
Alwin Bully (created or artist of the national flag of Dominica)

Prime Ministers
Dame Eugenia Charles 3rd
Pierre Charles 6th 
Roosevelt Douglas 5th
Edison James 4th
Patrick John 1st 
Oliver Seraphin 2nd
Roosevelt Skerrit now (present )

Leader(s) of the Opposition 
Lennox Linton

Political personalities
Patricia Scotland, Baroness Scotland of Asthal, current Commonwealth of Nations Secretary General; former Attorney General for England and Wales
Phyllis Shand Allfrey (1907–86), politician
Ronald Green, politician
Edward Oliver LeBlanc, government official
Emmanuel Christopher Loblack (1898–1995), union leader and politician
Cecil Rawle (1891–1938), attorney and politician

Spiritual personalities
Ogyen Trinley Dorje, (widely known as the 17th Karmapa) head of the Karma Kagyu school, one of the four main schools of Tibetan Buddhism.

Activists
Kellyn George
Whitney Mélinard, Kalinago Territory issues
Asquith Xavier, Dominican-born Briton who fought a colour bar to become the first non-white train guard at Euston station in London in 1966.

Actors
Danny John-Jules, of Red Dwarf and of Death in Paradise, filmed in Guadeloupe

Doctors
Jasmine R. Marcelin, physician

Media
Trisha Goddard, host of Trisha
Moira Stuart, female newsreader on British television and radio, working for the BBC
Urban Dangleben, proprietor of the first private radio station "Radio En Ba Mango" in the Commonwealth of Dominica..

Musicians
Gabrielle
Bashy
Pearle Christian
Nasio Fontaine
Ophelia Marie
Shakka
Swinging Stars
Windward Caribbean Kulture ("WCK")
Signal Band
Gordon Henderson Exile One
Freddy Nicholas
Fitzroy Williams
Phillip " Chubby" Mark and Marcel "Co" Mark of Midnight Groovers

Sports
Frank Bruno, professional boxer
Joe Cooke, footballer
Phillip DeFreitas, cricketer
Billy Doctrove, cricket umpire
Luan Gabriel, sprinter
Vince Hilaire, footballer
Manjrekar James, footballer
Garth Joseph, basketballer
Karina LeBlanc, footballer
Jerome Romain, athlete
Adam Sanford, cricketer
Grayson Shillingford, cricketer
Shane Shillingford, cricketer

Visual artists
Tam Joseph
Pauline Marcelle

Writers
Phyllis Shand Allfrey, novelist (The Orchid House)
Lennox Honychurch, historian (The Dominica Story)
Marie-Elena John, novelist (Unburnable) 
Elma Napier, novelist (Black and White Sands)
Jean Rhys, novelist (Wide Sargasso Sea) 
Alec Waugh, novelist (Island in the Sun)
Bernadine Lawrence, cookbook writer, columnist, television personality (How to Feed Your Family for Four Pounds a Day: The Benefit Book (1989 edition) / How to Feed Your Family for £5 a Day (1995 edition) / How to Feed Your Family for £5 a Day (2012 edition))

References